François Benoist (10 September 1794 – 6 May 1878) was a French organist, composer, and pedagogue.

Benoist was born in Nantes. He took his first music lessons under Georges Scheuermann. Benoist studied music at the Conservatoire de Paris and won the Prix de Rome in 1815 for his cantata Œnone. In 1819, he became organist (organiste du roi) and professor of organ at the Conservatoire; he held the latter post for half a century. His students included César Franck, Camille Saint-Saëns, Charles Lecocq, Georges Bizet, Louis Lefébure-Wely, Léo Delibes, and Adolphe Adam. As composer, he was comparatively unimportant, but he wrote two operas, four ballets, one Requiem Mass, and numerous works for organ. He died in Paris.

Selected compositions 
 Léonore et Félix, opéra-comique, 1821
 Chœur d'adieu, 1836
 La Gipsy, ballet, 1839
 Le Diable amoureux, ballet, 1840
 Bibliothèque de l'organiste, 12 volumes, 1841–1861
 Messe de Requiem pour trois voix d'homme et une d'enfant, avec accompagnement d'orgue ad libitum, 1842.
 Othello, opera, 1844
 L'Apparition, opera, 1848
 Nisida ou les Amazones des Açores, ballet (book by Eugène Deligny), 1848
 Paquerette, ballet (with Arthur Saint-Léon), 1851
 Deux Préludes, 1860
 Recueil de quatre morceaux pour orgue : Andante, Fugue sur le "Pange lingua", Marche religieuse, Communion, 1878
 Messe à 4 voix, orgue et orchestre, 1861
 Ave Maria pour mezzo-soprano
 Kyrie à 4 voix
 O Salutaris à une voix,
 Cantique à la Sainte Vierge

See also

External links 
 François Benoist : un maître nantais oublié (in French)
 
 La Gipsy, ballet, 3 acts, by Francois Benoist, French, digitized by BYU on archive.org

1794 births
1878 deaths
19th-century classical composers
Academic staff of the Conservatoire de Paris
Breton musicians
Composers for pipe organ
French ballet composers
French classical organists
French male classical composers
French opera composers
Male opera composers
French male organists
Musicians from Nantes
Prix de Rome for composition
19th-century French male musicians
Male classical organists
19th-century organists